The 2014 DFL-Supercup was the fifth edition of the German Super Cup under the name DFL-Supercup, an annual football match contested by the winners of the previous season's Bundesliga and DFB-Pokal competitions. It featured Bayern Munich, winners of the 2013–14 Bundesliga, and Borussia Dortmund, the runners-up of the 2013–14 Bundesliga who also reached the 2014 DFB-Pokal final.

Dortmund were the reigning champions, having beaten Bayern 4–2 in 2013, although the season before, Bayern beat Dortmund 2–1. Both teams had won four previous installments (of seven attempts by Bayern and six by Dortmund), and thus the winners would set a new record. The match took place on 13 August 2014 at Signal Iduna Park in Dortmund.

Dortmund defeated Munich 2–0 to win their record fifth title.

Teams
In the following table, matches until 1996 were in the DFB-Supercup era, since 2010 were in the DFL-Supercup era.

Match

Details

References

2014
2014–15 in German football
2014–15 in German football cups
Borussia Dortmund matches
FC Bayern Munich matches